Boreus insulanus is a species of snow scorpionfly in the family Boreidae. It is endemic to Vancouver Island.

References

Further reading

 

Boreus
Articles created by Qbugbot
Insects described in 2002
Endemic fauna of Canada
Endemic fauna of British Columbia
Vancouver Island
Insects of Canada